Airani Chitalia is a village in the Tufanganj I CD block in the Tufanganj subdivision of the Cooch Behar district in West Bengal, India

Geography

Location

Area overview
The map alongside shows the eastern part of the district. In Tufanganj subdivision 6.97% of the population lives in the urban areas and 93.02% lives in the rural areas. In Dinhata subdivision 5.98% of the population lives in the urban areas and 94.02% lives in the urban areas. The entire district forms the flat alluvial flood plains of mighty rivers.

Note: The map alongside presents some of the notable locations in the subdivisions. All places marked in the map are linked in the larger full screen map.

Demographics
As per the 2011 Census of India, Airani Chitalia had a total population of 5,036.  There were 2,604 (52%) males and 2,432 (48%) females. There were 546 persons in the age range of 0 to 6 years. The total number of literate people in Airan Chitalia was 3,669 (81.71% of the population over 6 years).

Culture
Among the temples of Airani Chitalia, the temple of Chandithakurani is famous. The original temple was erected by a Nazir of the Cooch Behar State (possibly by Khagendra Narayan). In those days the village was called Chithalia Dalbari. The original temple seems to have been destroyed long ago and a new one came up in its place. The present temple is a tin-roofed structure.

References 

Villages in Cooch Behar district